Strophomenata is an extinct class of brachiopods in the subphylum Rhynchonelliformea.

Orders

Billingsellida
An order that contains the suborder Clitambonitidina (and others?) .

Orthotetida
An order or superfamily that includes the Chilidiopsoidea.  Ontogeny given by Bassett and Popov (2017), resembling that of Kutorginides.

Believed to be sister to Strophomenides, = Strophomenida + Billinsellida + Productida.

Includes the Chileids (e.g. Coolinia).

References

External links 
 
 
 

 
Prehistoric protostome classes